Agnes Davies, born Agnes Morris, (30 September 1920 – 13 February 2011) was a Welsh snooker and billiards player. She was known for having a competitive playing career spanning 64 years, during which she won the Women's Professional Snooker Championship in 1949, and reached world championship snooker finals in 1940, 1948, 1950, and 1980.

Biography
Davies learned how to play billiards in her father's billiard hall in Saron, which he had set up using his compensation payment for pneumoconiosis caused by working as a coal miner. She first won the Welsh women's amateur championship in 1939, and won the following two years as well.

Davies, then still known as Agnes Morris, was runner up in the 1940 Women's Professional Snooker championship and the winner in 1949. She was married to Dick Davies (who died in 1996) in 1940, and took a break of some 30 years from competitive snooker. Returning to competition in the late 1970s, she won three tournaments before reaching another world championship final in 1980. In 1985 Davies was Voted Life President of the World Ladies' Billiards and Snooker Association (WLBSA).

In 1998 she qualified for the Ladies Welsh Open at Newport, Wales at the age of 77 – sixty years after winning as a 17-year-old and was ranked 46 in the Embassy Ladies World Rankings for 1997/98.

Until 1999, Davies played in the home international series for Wales. She also played in the Amman Valley league until 2001.

Davies died in 2011. In 2012, Women's World Snooker held the Agnes Davies Memorial tournament, which was won by Jaique Ip.

Titles and achievements

References

Welsh snooker players
Female snooker players
1920 births
2011 deaths
Sportspeople from Carmarthenshire